Yvesia is a genus of plants in the grass family. The only known species is Yvesia madagascariensis, found only in Madagascar.

References

Panicoideae
Monotypic Poaceae genera
Endemic flora of Madagascar
Taxa named by Aimée Antoinette Camus